
Gmina Stawiszyn is an urban-rural gmina (administrative district) in Kalisz County, Greater Poland Voivodeship, in west-central Poland.

Villages
Apart from the town of Stawiszyn, Gmina Stawiszyn contains the villages and settlements of Długa Wieś Druga, Długa Wieś Pierwsza, Długa Wieś Trzecia, Łyczyn, Miedza, Nowy Kiączyn, Ostrówek, Petryki, Piątek Mały, Piątek Mały-Kolonia, Piątek Wielki, Pólko, Stary Kiączyn, Werginki, Wyrów, Zbiersk, Zbiersk-Cukrownia, Zbiersk-Kolonia and Złotniki Małe-Kolonia.

Neighbouring gminas
Gmina Stawiszyn is bordered by the gminas of Blizanów, Grodziec, Mycielin, Rychwał and Żelazków.

References
Polish official population figures 2006

Gallery

Stawiszyn
Kalisz County